'Ali-Mirza, born Alexander (ალექსანდრე), (died 23 November 1737 or 1739) was a prince of the Georgian Bagrationi dynasty of the Kingdom of Kakheti who ruled in eastern Georgian provinces – Kartli and Kakheti – for the shah of Iran in the late 1730s. Like his father, King David II (Imam-Quli Khan), and brothers, Ali-Mirza was a convert to Islam. As a ruler of Kakheti, he is sometimes known in modern historiography by his Christian name Alexander and ascribed the regnal number "Third". Despite his power being derived from the shah, Ali Mirza followed the established Georgian tradition to style himself as "king of kings".

Wali of Kartli and Kakheti
Ali-Mirza was made a viceroy (wali) at Tbilisi, the capital of the kingdom of Kartli, in August 1735, by the Iranian warlord Nader after the victory over the Ottomans. The Persian officer Safi Khan was appointed to watch by him and the Muslim Georgian Ali Quli-Bek Amirejibi was placed in charge of collecting taxes. Ali-Mirza failed to gain foothold in the restive province and ran afoul of Safi Khan. In October 1736, Nader, now the shah of Iran, replaced Ali-Mirza with the Muslim Georgian prince Abdullah Beg, moving him to the government of Kakheti, from where his paternal uncle, Teimuraz, had been removed by Nader and was then accompanying the shah on the road to Kandahar.

Unable to gain popularity with the local population and facing an unrest, Ali-Mirza was equally disturbed by the pressure from his Iranian suzerains. In 1736, he even wrote to the Empress Anna of Russia, describing the difficult conditions of his reign and asking her for protection. Feeling that the shah now favored the more able Teimuraz, Ali-Mirza, under the influence of Prince Abel Andronikashvili, contemplated a revolt in Kakheti. To this end, he attempted, but failed to enlist the support of Teimuraz's consort, Tamar, who feared for the fate of her husband and son. Tamar, through the service of Prince Givi Cholokashvili, secured the loyalty of Kiziki and Pshavi, dissuading Ali-Mirza from his design. In a state of despair, Ali-Mirza repaired to Nader's camp in Kandahar, where he took command of the shah's Georgian regiments and died in a battle in 1737 or 1739.

Family
Ali-Mirza was married to Mariam, daughter of Shanshe II, Duke of Ksani. According to Cyril Toumanoff's genealogy, Ali-Mirza had two children, who retired and died in the Russian Empire:
Prince Ioane (Ivan Alexandrovich Bagration; 7 November 1730 – 28 September 1795), who had a son named Peter, whose fate is obscure;
Princess Ana

References 

1730s deaths
Converts to Shia Islam from Eastern Orthodoxy
Former Georgian Orthodox Christians
Bagrationi dynasty of the Kingdom of Kakheti
Year of birth unknown
Shia Muslims from Georgia (country)
Monarchs killed in action
Afsharid generals
Safavid governors of Kartli
Afsharid governors of Kakheti
Kings of Kakheti
Iranian people of Georgian descent
18th-century people from Georgia (country)